In geometry, a deltahedron (plural deltahedra) is a polyhedron whose faces are all equilateral triangles. The name is taken from the Greek upper case delta (Δ), which has the shape of an equilateral triangle. There are infinitely many deltahedra, all having an even number of faces by the handshaking lemma. Of these only eight are convex, having 4, 6, 8, 10, 12, 14, 16 and 20 faces. The number of faces, edges, and vertices is listed below for each of the eight convex deltahedra.

The eight convex deltahedra 
There are only eight strictly-convex deltahedra: three are regular polyhedra, and five are Johnson solids. The three regular convex polyhedra are indeed Platonic solids.

In the 6-faced deltahedron, some vertices have degree 3 and some degree 4. In the 10-, 12-, 14-, and 16-faced deltahedra, some vertices have degree 4 and some degree 5. These five irregular deltahedra belong to the class of Johnson solids: convex polyhedra with regular polygons for faces.

Deltahedra retain their shape even if the edges are free to rotate around their vertices so that the angles between edges are fluid.  Not all polyhedra have this property:  for example, if you relax some of the angles of a cube, the cube can be deformed into a non-right square prism.

There is no 18-faced convex deltahedron. However, the edge-contracted icosahedron gives an example of an octadecahedron that can either be made convex with 18 irregular triangular faces, or made with equilateral triangles that include two coplanar sets of three triangles.

Non-strictly convex cases 
There are infinitely many cases with coplanar triangles, allowing for sections of the infinite triangular tilings. If the sets of coplanar triangles are considered a single face, a smaller set of faces, edges, and vertices can be counted. The coplanar triangular faces can be merged into rhombic, trapezoidal, hexagonal, or other equilateral polygon faces.

Some smaller examples include:

Non-convex forms 
There are an infinite number of nonconvex forms.

Some examples of face-intersecting deltahedra:

 Great icosahedron - a Kepler-Poinsot solid, with 20 intersecting triangles
 

Other nonconvex deltahedra can be generated by adding equilateral pyramids to the faces of all 5 Platonic solids:

Other augmentations of the tetrahedron include:

Also by adding inverted pyramids to faces:
 Excavated dodecahedron

See also
 Simplicial polytope - polytopes with all simplex facets

References

Further reading
. 
.
. 
. 
 pp. 35–36

External links 
 
 The eight convex deltahedra 
 Deltahedron 
 Deltahedron 

Polyhedra